Handle with Care is a 1922 American silent comedy film directed by Phil Rosen. It stars Grace Darmond, Harry Myers, and James Morrison, and was released on January 22, 1922.

Plot
As described in a film magazine, Jeanne Lee (Darmond) has been wooed by five young men. She finally makes up her mind and marries one of them, David Norris (Stevens). Everything goes well until David, engrossed in his business, becomes neglectful and gets mixed up on the date of his wedding anniversary. Jeanne is indignant and intimates that a divorce is the only solution. David consents to this on the condition that she persuade one of her former suitors to elope with her while he proves that he is really worthy of her. She tries one suitor after the other, but meets with failure. The first has become infatuated with another young woman and is consequently disinterested in eloping with Jeanne. The second one proves his unworthiness when he agrees to accept $10,000 from David to not elope with his wife. The third one, who had one declared that he was ready to die for her, suddenly has a change of heart when confronted with the opportunity to do so. By this time, the young wife has become convinced that it is her husband that she loves after all. The fourth suitor demands that Jeanne elope with him, but she has had enough. This convinces her husband that she learned her lesson through his careful handling. It turns out that the proffer of the last suitor was a frame-up and that he has actually married Marian (Miller), a ward of David's. Together the two couples leave on a tour of foreign lands.

Cast list
 Grace Darmond as Jeanne Lee
 Harry Myers as Ned Picard
 James Morrison as Phil Burnham
 Landers Stevens as David Norris
 William Austin as Peter Carter
 William Courtleigh as MacCullough
 Patsy Ruth Miller as Marian

References

External links

Films directed by Phil Rosen
1922 comedy films
1922 films
Silent American comedy films
American silent feature films
American black-and-white films
Associated Exhibitors films
1920s American films